David Joseph Lowery (born 20 January 1984) is an English football striker who plays for the SWA Sharks of MFL League.

Club career
Lowery once played for Tottenham Hotspur U-16. After an unsuccessful spell, he arrived back in the north east of England to play for a clutch of local clubs. He joined the Chemfica at the start of the 2009/10 season as their lead target man. Despite an early goal in pre-season, his term with the club ended with no competitive goals due to an achilles injury which has seen him not return to action since.

International career
Lowery made his debut for the Turks and Caicos Islands in a World Cup qualification match against Saint Lucia in February 2008, scoring his first international goal. He also played in the return match, his only caps earned so far.

References

External links
 

1984 births
Living people
Footballers from Newcastle upon Tyne
English expatriate sportspeople in the Turks and Caicos Islands
Association football forwards
English footballers
Turks and Caicos Islands footballers
Turks and Caicos Islands international footballers
20th-century English people
21st-century English people
South Shields F.C. (1974) players
Gateshead F.C. players
English expatriate footballers
Expatriate footballers in the Turks and Caicos Islands